"Stockholm" is an instrumental composition released by Lawrence Welk and His Orchestra in 1964. The single spent 2 weeks on the Billboard Hot 100 chart, peaking at No. 91.

"Stockholm" was the lead song of the album Early Hits of 1964, released by Lawrence Welk and His Orchestra in 1964, which spent 19 weeks on Billboards chart of Top LPs, peaking at No. 37.

References

1964 singles
1964 songs
Dot Records singles
Pop instrumentals
1960s instrumentals